Hans Adolf Bjerrum (8 September 1899 – 10 May 1979) was a Danish field hockey player who competed in the 1920 Summer Olympics.

He was a member of the Danish field hockey team, which won the silver medal. He later formed the Danish civil engineering company Bierrum, known for building cooling towers for power stations.

References

External links
 
profile

1899 births
1979 deaths
People from Gentofte Municipality
Danish civil engineers
Danish company founders
Danish male field hockey players
Olympic field hockey players of Denmark
Field hockey players at the 1920 Summer Olympics
Olympic silver medalists for Denmark
Olympic medalists in field hockey
Medalists at the 1920 Summer Olympics